Shuttarna II (or Šuttarna) was a king of the Hurrian kingdom of Mitanni in the early 14th century BC.

Shuttarna was a descendant and probably a son of the great Mitannian king Artatama I. He was an ally of the Egyptian Pharaoh Amenhotep III and the diplomatic dealings of the kings are briefly recorded in the Amarna letters EA#182, EA#183 and EA#184. Shuttarna's daughter Kilu-Hepa (sometimes spelled Gilukhepa) was given to Amenhotep III in marriage to seal the alliance between the two royal houses in the Pharaoh's 10th regnal year, taking with her a great dowry.

During the reign of Shuttarna, the kingdom of Mitanni reached its height of power and prosperity. From Alalakh in the west, Mitanni shared its border with Egypt in northern Syria, approximately by the river Orontes. Two tablets sealed by Shuttarna were found at Tall Bazi on the Euphrates. Other tablets sealed by him were found at Alalakh, Tell Brak, Nuzi and Umm el-Marra.The heart of the kingdom was in the Khabur River basin where the capital Washshukanni was situated. Assyria as well as Arrapha in the east were vassal kingdoms of Mitanni. The Hittites attempted to invade the northern border lands of Mitanni, but were defeated by Shuttarna.

He was succeeded by his son, Tushratta, or possibly Artashumara, under dubious circumstances.

See also

Mitanni

References

Hurrian kings
14th-century BC rulers